FC Elva is a football club, based in Elva, Estonia, that competes in the Esiliiga, the second level of Estonian football.

History
Elva came close to rising to the top-division Meistriliiga for the first time following successful 2022 season, but they lost in the promotion play-offs to TJK Legion. A month later Legion had to renounce their league spot due to financial trouble. According to the rules Legion's place was given to Pärnu Vaprus, who finished the season last behind Legion.

Players

First-team squad

Personnel

Current technical staff

Managerial history

Statistics

League and Cup

References

External links
 Official website 

 
Elva
Association football clubs established in 2000
2000 establishments in Estonia
Tartu County